Robert Andrew Brown (born 21 August 1957) is a South African former cricketer. He played three first-class matches for Boland between 1986 and 1990.

References

External links
 

1957 births
Living people
South African cricketers
Boland cricketers
Sportspeople from Qonce